James Forbes, 17th Lord Forbes (died 29 July 1804) was the son of James Forbes, 16th Lord Forbes.

In 1760, he married Catherine Innes and they had six children:

Mary Elizabeth Forbes (d. 1803)
Marjory Forbes (1761–1842)
James Ochoncar Forbes, 17th Lord Forbes (1765–1843)
Robert Allaster Cam Forbes, Captain Royal Navy (d. HMS Dryad, 1795)
Andrew Forbes (d. 1808)
William Forbes (d. 1792)

References

Year of birth missing
1804 deaths
Lords Forbes